Several treaties are named Treaty of Windsor.  The most famous is the treaty of 1386 between England and Portugal, the world's oldest recorded allegiance between two nations.

Treaty of Windsor (1175) between England and Ireland.
Treaty of Windsor (1357) between England and France (not ratified).
Treaty of Windsor (1386) between England and Portugal.
Treaty of Windsor (1522) between England and the Holy Roman Empire.
Treaty of Windsor (1899) between England and Portugal.